Saint Barbara Catholic Church, also known as Santa Barbara Catholic Church and Akosombo Catholic Church, is a small church situated at one of the highest points in Akosombo, Ghana, overlooking the Akosombo Dam.  It was constructed in September 1962 by Impregilo SPA in 21 days. It was built as a place of worship by the staff of Impregilo during the building of the dam.  Subsequently, a memorial plaque was placed in the church to honor the 28 staff of Impregilo SPA who died building the dam.

Origin and inspiration

The church was named after and dedicated to Saint Barbara, the patron saint of the contractors who built the dam and the church. The Church was built to provide a worshipping place and also host the then Archbishop of Milan, Giovanni Battista Montini, who later became Pope Paul VI. He was visiting Ghana that year.

The church, which was completed in 21 days, was designed to resemble praying hands.

Akosombo Dam memorial

A memorial plaque sits in the church in memory of 28 staff of Impregilo SPA that died building the Akosombo Dam, 12 of whom died in an explosion.

Victims of  February 15, 1966 explosion

On the February 15th 1966 at 7:15am, there was an explosion at the Akosombo Dam's site. 
It was suspected that a heavy and unexpected build-up of methane gas or natural gas within one of the tunnels in the dam caused the explosion. The gas was possibly ignited by the lighting of a welding torch. 18 people  were in the tunnel at the  time of the explosion. 12 died from shock from burns.

Heroes of Akosombo

Gallery

References

External links
 Catholic Diocese of Koforidua

Roman Catholic churches in Ghana
Roman Catholic churches completed in 1962
Eastern Region (Ghana)
20th-century Roman Catholic church buildings